Francis Hastings, Lord Hastings (1560 – 17 December 1595) was the son of George Hastings, 4th Earl of Huntingdon and Dorothy Port.  He married Sarah Harington, daughter of Sir James Harington and Lucy Sydney. They had five children:
 Catherine, who married Philip Stanhope, 1st Earl of Chesterfield, died 28 August 1636
 Henry, who succeeded his grandfather as Earl of Huntingdon.
 Sir George Hastings
 Captain Edward Hastings, died 1617
 Theodosia Hastings, married Sir Francis Bodenham.

His widow, Sara or Sarah Harington (1565-1628), married Sir George Kingsmill, then Edward 11th Baron Zouche, and finally, Sir Thomas Edmondes. Her portrait was painted by Isaac Oliver and by Cornelius Johnson. The portraits by Johnson show her aged 63 wearing a large miniature case referring to Frederick V of the Palatinate with the Greek letter "phi". A similar miniature case was described in an inventory of a Scottish soldier.

Britain's Real Monarch
In Britain's Real Monarch, the oldest son is in the alternative succession to the Plantagenet monarch  
 Henry Hastings, 5th Earl of Huntingdon, 1604–1643
 Ferdinando Hastings, 6th Earl of Huntingdon, 1643–1656
 Theophilus Hastings, 7th Earl of Huntingdon, 1656–1701
 George Hastings, 8th Earl of Huntingdon, 1701–1704
 Theophilus Hastings, 9th Earl of Huntingdon, 1704—1746
 Francis Hastings, 10th Earl of Huntingdon, 1746–1789
 Elizabeth Rawdon, Countess of Moira, 1789–1808
 Francis Rawdon-Hastings, 1st Marquess of Hastings, 1808–1826
 George Rawdon-Hastings, 2nd Marquess of Hastings, 1826–1844
 Paulyn Rawdon-Hastings, 3rd Marquess of Hastings, 1844–1851
 Henry Rawdon-Hastings, 4th Marquess of Hastings, 1851–1868
 Edith Rawdon-Hastings, 10th Countess of Loudoun, 1844–1874
 Charles Rawdon-Hastings, 11th Earl of Loudoun, 1874–1920
 Edith Abney-Hastings, 12th Countess of Loudoun, 1920–1960
 Barbara Abney-Hastings, 13th Countess of Loudoun, 1960–2002
 Michael Abney-Hastings, 14th Earl of Loudoun, 2002–2012
 Simon Abney-Hastings, 15th Earl of Loudoun, 2012–

Elizabeth II is also descended from the oldest sister 
 Catherine Hastings, †1636 
 Henry, Lord Stanhope, 1606–1634 
 Philip Stanhope, Earl of Chesterfield, 1634–1714 
 Elizabeth Stanhope, 1663–1723 
 Thomas Lyon, Earl of Strathmore, 1704–1753 
 John Lyon, Earl of Strathmore, 1737–1776 
 Thomas Bowes-Lyon, Earl of Strathmore, 1773–1846 
 Thomas George Bowes-Lyon, Lord Glamis, 1801–1834 
 Claude Bowes-Lyon, Earl of Strathmore, 1824–1904 
 Claude Bowes-Lyon, Earl of Strathmore, 1855–1944 
 Elizabeth Bowes-Lyon, 1900–2002 
 Elizabeth II Windsor, Queen of Great Britain and Northern Ireland, 1926–

References

thePeerage.com

1560 births
1595 deaths
16th-century English nobility
Francis Hastings, Lord Hastings
Heirs apparent who never acceded
British courtesy barons and lords of Parliament
People from Ashby-de-la-Zouch